The Best Male Action Sports Athlete ESPY Award is an annual award honoring the achievements of a male athlete from the world of action sports. It was first awarded as part of the ESPY Awards in 2004 after the non-gender-specific Best Action Sports Athlete ESPY Award was presented the previous two years (with American snowboarder Shaun White receiving the 2003 award). The Best Male Action Sports Athlete ESPY Award trophy, created by sculptor Lawrence Nowlan, is presented to the male adjudged to be the best action sports athlete in a given calendar year. Balloting for the award is undertaken by fans over the Internet from between three and five choices selected by the ESPN Select Nominating Committee, which is composed of a panel of experts. It is conferred in July to reflect performance and achievement over the preceding twelve months. 

The inaugural winner of the Best Male Action Sports Athlete ESPY Award at the 2004 awards was freestyle BMX rider Ryan Nyquist. During 1997 and 2003, Nyquist won eleven out of eighteen available freestyle BMX medals at the X Games. He became the first freestyle BMX rider to be nominated for, and thus the first to win, an ESPY Award. The 2006 winner of the Best Male Action Sports Athlete ESPY Award was Shaun White. He was nominated a further five consecutive times between the 2008 and 2012 ceremonies, all of which he won, making him the athlete with the most victories with six. The two other athletes to have earned successive awards are street skateboarder Nyjah Huston and motocross rider Ryan Dungey. Canadian snowboarder Mark McMorris became the first non-American to win the accolade in 2017  by earning three medals at that year's X Games in Minneapolis. Snowboarders are the most successful sportspeople with seven awards, followed by motocross riders, with four, and street skateboarders, with three. It was not awarded in 2020 due to the COVID-19 pandemic. The most recent winner of the award was American Motocross and Supercross racer Eli Tomac in 2022.

Winners and nominees

See also
 Best Female Action Sports Athlete ESPY Award
 Laureus World Sports Award for Action Sportsperson of the Year

References

External links
 

Awards established in 2004
ESPY Awards